Saint-Paul-de-Vézelin is a former commune in the Loire department in central France. On 1 January 2019, it was merged into the new commune Vézelin-sur-Loire.

See also
Communes of the Loire department

References

Saintpauldevezelin